S88 may refer to:
 BenQ-Siemens S88, a BenQ Mobile phone
 Daihatsu Hijet (S88), a kei truck and microvan
 , a submarine of the Royal Navy
 ISA-88, a standard addressing batch process control
 Märklin s88, a model railway control system
 S88 Zhengzhou–Xixia Expressway, China
 Skykomish State Airport, in Washington, United States